Brenda Tirhani Mathevula is a South African politician who represents Limpopo in the National Council of Provinces. She is a member of the Economic Freedom Fighters. She became a Member of Parliament in December 2016, following the cessation of Emmanuel Mtileni's party membership.

During her tenure in the NCOP, she opposed the 2018 national minimum wage legislation, citing that it was too little and would not reduce unemployment and poverty.

References

External links

Ms Brenda Tirhani Mathevula – Parliament of South Africa. Archived on 18 June 2020.

Living people
Year of birth missing (living people)
People from Limpopo
Economic Freedom Fighters politicians
Members of the National Council of Provinces
21st-century South African politicians
South African women in politics
Women members of the National Council of Provinces